Wheeler is an unincorporated census-designated place (CDP) in northern Union Township, Porter County, in the U.S. state of Indiana. It lies along State Road 130, northwest of the city of Valparaiso.  Although Wheeler is unincorporated, it has a post office, with the ZIP code of 46393. The population of Wheeler was 443 at the 2010 census.

History 
Wheeler was founded in 1858 when the railroad was extended to that point. A post office has been in operation at Wheeler since 1858.

Demographics 

The population at the 2010 census was 443. There ware 214 males (48.4%) and 229 females (51.6%). The median resident age is 48.5 in Wheeler compared to the median age of 37.7 in Indiana. The estimated median household income in 2017 was $65,747 In Wheeler compared to $54,181 in Indiana. The estimated per capita income in 2017 was $32,521. The percentage of residents living in poverty in 2017 was 3%.

Education
Wheeler is served by the Union Township School Corporation, which includes Wheeler High School, Union Township Middle School, and two elementary schools. Wheeler today is still part of Union Township and has remained as the largest community in the township by population.

References 

Census-designated places in Porter County, Indiana
Census-designated places in Indiana